Chah-e Mobarak District is in Asaluyeh County, Bushehr province, Iran. At the 2006 and 2011 censuses, its constituent parts were in Asaluyeh District of Kangan County. At the 2006 census, the population was 10,437 in 1,632 households. The following census in 2011 counted 13,220 people in 2,709 households. The district's establishment was officially announced on 12 December 2012. At the latest census in 2016, the district had 17,703 inhabitants living in 4,272 households.

References 

Districts of Bushehr Province
Populated places in Asaluyeh County